The Tayson Gallantry is a 1991 Vietnamese 35mm wuxia film directed by Lê Hoàng Hoa in his art name Khôi Nguyên, adapted from Lê Hoàng Khải's 1990 novel The Jade Lamp martial art (玉盞神功).

Plot
 Episode 1 : The Tayson Gallantry
 Episode 2 : The Jade Lamp Martial-art

Production
Location is Bình Định in 1991.

Art
 Costume : Cố Đô Tailorshop

Cast

Episode 1
 Lý Hùng
 Diễm Hương
 Mộng Vân
 Hương Giang
 Ngọc Hiệp
 Lê Cung Bắc
 Trần Minh Dậu
 Phạm Đức Long
 Trần Công Tuấn
 Trần Thanh Trúc
 Ngọc Đặng
 Hoàng Phúc
 Thanh Mai
 Trần Quang Hiếu
 Tư Lê
 Monk Giác Huệ Viên
 Hoàng Triều
 Nguyễn Lượng
 Trần Công Thiện
 Bình Minh
 Lâm Thế Thành
 Huyền Linh
 Nhật Minh
 Văn Thành
 Thu Hương
 Thanh Thủy
 Trần Lộc
 Hoàng Ngân
 Mã Trung
 Văn Ngà
 Văn Mến
 Thành Lũy
 Anh Triều
 Lê Công Thế
 Thu Vân
 Sĩ Hùng
 Thanh Hùng
 Văn Thành
 Khôn Hải
 Thanh Tài
 Bá Lộc
 Thanh Linh
 Công Thành
 Lê Tuấn
Episode 2
 Lê Tuấn Anh
 Việt Trinh
 Mỹ Duyên
 Lý Minh
 Lê Ngân
 Trọng Hải
 Thạch Ngà
 Thạch Hùng
 Hắc Hổ
 Quang Hiếu
 Trần Long
 Mạc Can
 Lê Hải
 Nguyễn Khôi
 Tiến Dũng
 Lê Đạt
 Trung Nam
 Bảo Hạnh
 Thụy Giao
 Hải Diễm
 Văn Bình
 Ngọc Ái
 Đình Lan
 Thành Tài
 Công Duẩn
 Thái Hoàng
 Thanh Long
 Hữu Thuận
 Minh Thiên
 Xuân Bình
 Quang Thái
 Lê Cương
 Lê Dũng

References

 The most impressed classical costume film on Vietnamese screen
 Vietnamese wuxia film The Tayson Gallantry

Lê Hoàng Hoa
Vietnamese historical films
Vietnamese adventure films
Vietnamese thriller films
Wuxia films
Films based on works by Vietnamese writers
1991 films